Schizonotus may refer to:

Animals 
 Schizonotus (wasp), a genus of parasitic wasps in the subfamily Pteromalinae

Plants 
 A rejected synonym of Sorbaria, in family Rosaceae
 An illegitimate synonym of Asclepias, in family Apocynaceae
 An illegitimate synonym of Holodiscus, in family Rosaceae